

Nicolae N. Alexandri (17 May 1859, Chişinău - 17 November 1931, Chişinău) was a Bessarabian politician.

Biography 
Nicolae N. Alexandri graduated from Saint Petersburg State University. He was the first editor in chief of Cuvânt moldovenesc.

Nicolae N. Alexandri served as Member of the Moldovan Parliament (1917-1918). On  Sfatul Țării opened as the first parliament of the autonomous Bessarabia. In the front of the hall, the elder of the delegates, Nicolae N. Alexandri took the place of the president of the session.

Gallery

Bibliography  
Gheorghe E. Cojocaru, Sfatul Țării: itinerar, Civitas, Chişinău, 1998,  
Mihai Taşcă, Sfatul Țării şi actualele autorităţi locale, "Timpul de dimineaţă", no. 114 (849), June 27, 2008 (page 16)

External links  
 Arhiva pentru Sfatul Tarii 
 Deputaţii Sfatului Ţării şi Lavrenti Beria

Notes

1859 births
1931 deaths
Politicians from Chișinău
People from Kishinyovsky Uyezd
Moldovan MPs 1917–1918
Saint Petersburg State University alumni